Tim Hicks (born October 20, 1979) is a former American football quarterback who played three seasons in the Arena Football League with the Los Angeles Avengers and Alabama Vipers. He played college football at West Liberty State College and attended Lake Weir High School in Ocala, Florida. He was also a member of the Charleston Swamp Foxes, Wilkes-Barre/Scranton Pioneers, Nashville Kats, Bossier–Shreveport Battle Wings, Columbus Destroyers and Quad City Steamwheelers.

References

External links
Just Sports Stats

Living people
1979 births
Players of American football from Florida
American football quarterbacks
West Liberty Hilltoppers football players
Charleston Swamp Foxes players
Wilkes-Barre/Scranton Pioneers players
Nashville Kats players
Bossier–Shreveport Battle Wings players
Columbus Destroyers players
Quad City Steamwheelers players
Los Angeles Avengers players
Alabama Vipers players
Sportspeople from Ocala, Florida